The Exchequer Rolls of Scotland (Latin:) are records of the Scottish Exchequer dating from 1326 to 1708. The accounts were the responsibility of the Comptroller of Scotland. The National Records of Scotland also has corresponding precepts and receipts for some comptrollery accounts, known as "vouchers".

Publication
The rolls up to the year 1600 were published in book form in the late nineteenth and early twentieth centuries, with a new numbering scheme.

The Exchequer Rolls of Scotland, 1326-1600, 23 vols. (1878-1908)

 (1884) Vol VII A.D. 1468-1469

See also
 Pipe Rolls

References

External links
 National Records of Scotland: Guide to the Exchequer Records
 George Powell McNeill, Exchequer Rolls of Scotland: 1595-1600, vol. 23 (Edinburgh, 1908).
 https://www.electricscotland.com/books/pdf/exchequer_rolls.htm

Copies online at Internet Archive

1326 in Scotland
Medieval documents of Scotland
Economy of Scotland
Legal manuscripts
Economic history of Scotland
Monarchy and money
Scottish exchequer